Deliver is the ninth country studio album by The Oak Ridge Boys, released in 1983. It includes two singles: "Ozark Mountain Jubilee" and "I Guess It Never Hurts to Hurt Sometimes", the latter reaching number one on Billboard's Hot Country Songs.

Track listing

Personnel

The Oak Ridge Boys
Duane Allen - lead vocals
Joe Bonsall - tenor vocals
William Lee Golden - baritone vocals
Richard Sterban - bass vocals

Additional Musicians
Acoustic Guitar: Kenny Bell, Jimmy Capps, Jerry Shook
Bass guitar: David Hood, Joe Osborn, Jack Williams
Drums: Clyde Brooks, Gene Chrisman, Roger Hawkins, Jerry Kroon
Electric Guitar: Jimmy Johnson, Wayne Perkins, Billy Sanford, Reggie Young
Fiddle: Kenny Lovelace
Harmonica: Dewey Dorough
Horns: Harrison Calloway Jr., Jim Horn, Charles Rose, Harvey Thompson
Keyboards: Barry Beckett, Clayton Ivey, Steve Nathan, Ron Oates
Percussion: Mickey Buckins
Saxophone: Dewey Dorough, Denis Solee
Steel Guitar: Pete Drake, Weldon Myrick
String Arranger: Bergen White
Synthesizer: Steve Nathan

Chart performance

Album

Singles

The Oak Ridge Boys albums
1983 albums
MCA Records albums
Albums produced by Ron Chancey